Ali Raza (born 10 November 1976) is a Pakistani field hockey player. He competed at the 2000 Summer Olympics and the 2004 Summer Olympics.

References

External links
 

1976 births
Living people
Pakistani male field hockey players
Olympic field hockey players of Pakistan
Field hockey players at the 2000 Summer Olympics
Field hockey players at the 2004 Summer Olympics
1998 Men's Hockey World Cup players
2002 Men's Hockey World Cup players
Place of birth missing (living people)